IFH may refer to:

 Inova Fairfax Hospital
 Icon for Hire, an American rock band